Anna Rupprecht (born 29 December 1996) is a German ski jumper. She made her Continental Cup debut in the 2008/09 season, and her World Cup debut in the 2011/12 season. Her best individual result is a third place in Lillehammer on 2 December 2016, but her season was cut short after suffering an ACL injury in Nizhny Tagil, on 11 December.

World Championship results

References

External links

1996 births
German female ski jumpers
Living people
FIS Nordic World Ski Championships medalists in ski jumping
21st-century German women